Pekka Viljanen (13 June 1921 – 2 December 1995) was a Finnish racewalker. He competed in the men's 50 kilometres walk at the 1952 Summer Olympics.

References

1921 births
1995 deaths
Athletes (track and field) at the 1952 Summer Olympics
Finnish male racewalkers
Olympic athletes of Finland
Place of birth missing